The Jensen Project is the second in the Family Movie Night TV movies series produced by Procter & Gamble and Walmart aimed at families.

The movie featured embedded marketing for the Kinect, a motion sensor add-on to the Xbox 360, several months before the product's launch. The movie featured the Moller Skycar, a vertical take-off and landing aircraft or "flying car".

Plot
After a 16-year absence from the Jensen Project, a secret community of scientists conducting advanced underground experiments to resolve the world's problems, Matt (Brady Smith) and Claire Thompson (Kellie Martin) are asked to come back and stop Edwin Jensen (David Andrews) from using nanobots to take over other people. To create these nanobots, Edwin needs a molecular assembler, which he steals. With the help of Kendrick James (LeVar Burton), Ginny (Mylène Dinh-Robic) and Ingrid Jensen (Patricia Richardson), Matt and Claire use chemical traces of gold and silicon to track down the location of the assembler. They are misled, but Brody (Justin Kelly), and his new friend from the Project, Samantha (Alyssa Diaz), manage to trace Edwin through a voice tracker and retrieve the molecular assembler. Brody is caught and implanted with nanobots. Edwin threatens to kill Brody with the nanobots if the molecular assembler is not returned to him. The Project members mount a successful mission to destroy Edwin's laboratory and capture him before he can execute his plan to harm others with the nanobots.

Cast
Kellie Martin as Claire Thompson
Brady Smith as Dr. Matt Thompson
LeVar Burton as Kendrick
Justin Kelly as Brody Thompson
Alyssa Diaz as Samantha "Sam" Cortez
Patricia Richardson as Ingrid Jensen
David Andrews as Edwin Jensen

Production
Procter & Gamble and Walmart started out with plans for three movies in the Family Movie Night. By early 2010, NBC was brought in as the broadcaster. The telefilm was filmed in Toronto by Muse Entertainment Enterprises and Procter & Gamble Productions starting in late February 2010.

Reception
Ratings for the July 16, 2010 airing on NBC were disappointing with fewer than 4 million viewers while being one of two new programs that night, and came in third for the night. The film was widely panned by critics. Los Angeles Times reviewer called the movie "super-bad", criticizing the dialog and the embedded marketing of Procter & Gamble and Walmart products, but "it's almost worth watching for its 'Mystery Science Theater 3000' potential." Brian Lowry	of Variety stated that the "Shoddy looking and saddled with a story that makes most Disney Channel fare look like Masterpiece Theater, this inane adventure is most notable for some of the clunkiest product-placement ever." At the IMDB, as of September 19, 2018, the movie received a weighted average vote of 4.9 out of 10 with 380 user voting.

See also
 Product placement
 Secrets of the Mountain

References

External links

Walmart
Television films as pilots
2010 television films
2010 films
NBC network original films
American science fiction television films
Canadian science fiction television films
English-language Canadian films
Films shot in Toronto
2010 science fiction films
Films directed by Douglas Barr
2010s Canadian films
2010s American films